Kenneth Watson (16 November 1931 – 21 July 1998) was a British television actor. He is best known for playing Brian Blair in Take the High Road in the 1980s, Ralph Lancaster in Coronation Street from 14 May 1975 to 13 February 1980 and DI Scott in Dixon of Dock Green from 1972-3, together with numerous minor roles in various sitcoms.

Watson was born in London, England in November 1931.

He appeared in the Doctor Who serial The Wheel in Space as Bill Duggan, and was also booked to play a farmer in a later serial The Time Monster but was replaced by George Lee. In film, possibly his most memorable role was also Doctor Who related, with a supporting role in the Peter Cushing vehicle Daleks' Invasion Earth 2150 A.D..

Watson had a wife, Joan; and two children, Kate and Jamie. He died from pancreatic cancer on 21 July 1998, at the age of 66.

Partial filmography
First Men in the Moon (1964) - Second Reporter (uncredited)
Daleks' Invasion Earth 2150 A.D. (1966) - Craddock
Nothing But the Night (1973) - Jamie
Blind Man's Bluff (1977) - Mr. Hunter
Sky Pirates (1977) - Police Sergeant

References

External links

1931 births
1998 deaths
Male actors from London
Deaths from pancreatic cancer
English male television actors
20th-century British male actors